Heinrich August Hahn (19 June 1821 – 1 December 1861) was a German theologian and the eldest son of the theologian August Hahn.

Life
Hahn was born in Königsberg. After studying theology at the universities of Breslau (Wrocław) and Berlin, he became successively a privatdozent at Breslau (1845), a professor ad interim (1846) at Königsberg on the death of Heinrich Havernick, an associate professor of theology (1851) and a full professor (1861) at the University of Greifswald.

Selected works 
Amongst his published works were a commentary on the Book of Job (1850), a translation of the Song of Songs (1852), an exposition of Isaiah xl.-lxvi. (1857) and a commentary on the Book of Ecclesiastes (1860).
 Veteris Testamenti Sententia De Natura Hominis Exposita : Commentatio Biblico Theologica, (1846).
 Commentar ueber das Buch Hiob (1850).
 Das Hohe Lied von Salomo, (1852).
 Commentar über das Predigerbuch Salomo's (1860).
With Franz Delitzsch, he edited and completed Moritz Drechsler's Der Prophet Jesaja ("The Prophet Isaiah").

Notes

References 
 
 Also see the articles in Herzog-Hauck, Realencyklopadie, and the Allgemeine Deutsche Biographie.

1821 births
1861 deaths
19th-century German Protestant theologians
Academic staff of the University of Greifswald
Scientists from Königsberg
19th-century German male writers
German male non-fiction writers